Marc Roca may refer to:

Marc Roca Barceló (born 1988), Spanish water polo player
Marc Roca (footballer) (born 1996), Spanish footballer